Jack Nixon Browne, Baron Craigton CBE PC (3 September 1904 – 28 July 1993) was a Scottish Conservative politician.

Early life
The son of Edwin Gilbert Izod, he adopted the surname Browne in 1920 as his family felt his more unusual surname a handicap.

Educated at Cheltenham College, Browne served in World War II as an Acting Group Captain in Balloon Command of the Royal Air Force. He was awarded the CBE in 1944.

Managed the Carntyne Greyhound Stadium, Glasgow in the later 1920s. Whilst there he tried to "cash-in" on the enw craze of 1928, dirt track racing. He built a track inside the greyhound track. The venture was not successful but as Jack Nixon-Browne he raced in both meetings he staged. He won most of his races in the second meeting as he had unlimited time to practice.

Political career
He unsuccessfully contested the working-class constituency of Glasgow Govan in 1945, but was elected as Member of Parliament for the seat in 1950, holding it until 1955. He was then elected as Member for Glasgow Craigton in 1955, holding that seat until September 1959 at which point he was elevated to the House of Lords.

He was Parliamentary Private Secretary to the Secretary of State for Scotland from 1952 until April 1955, when he was appointed a Parliamentary Under-Secretary of State for Scotland. In November 1959 he was created a life peer, as Baron Craigton, of Renfield in the County of the City of Glasgow.

In October 1959 he was promoted to Minister of State for Scotland, holding that office until October 1964. He was appointed a Privy Counsellor in 1961. He later held a number of important business positions, including chairman of United Biscuits Holdings, and was associated with environmental groups including the World Wildlife Fund.

Arms

References

External links
 

1904 births
1993 deaths
Anglo-Scots
Craigton 
Members of the Parliament of the United Kingdom for Scottish constituencies
Members of the Parliament of the United Kingdom for Glasgow constituencies
Commanders of the Order of the British Empire
Unionist Party (Scotland) MPs
UK MPs 1950–1951
UK MPs 1951–1955
UK MPs 1955–1959
UK MPs who were granted peerages
Royal Air Force officers
Royal Air Force personnel of World War II
Members of the Privy Council of the United Kingdom
Ministers in the Eden government, 1955–1957
Ministers in the Macmillan and Douglas-Home governments, 1957–1964
Life peers created by Elizabeth II